Dr Emerich Frivaldszky von Frivald (6 February 1799 in Bacskó, Hungary (now Bačkov, Trebišov District, Slovakia) – 19 October 1870 in Jobbágyi, Hungary), known as Imre Frivaldszky, was a Hungarian botanist and entomologist.

Biography
Born into a family of  landed gentry, Frivaldszky studied at the gymnasiums in Sátoraljaújhely and Eger, then philosophy at the Royal Academy of Kassa. He graduated in medicine from the University of Budapest in 1823.

While still a student in Eger he accompanied Pál Kitaibel and Jószef Sadler on botanical excursions. By the time he graduated in medicine he was already assistant curator at the Hungarian National Museum in Budapest in 1822, where he later served as curator until his retirement in 1851. In 1824 he abandoned the practice of medicine and spent the rest of his life as a botanist and zoologist. He made many collecting trips throughout Hungary, Ottoman Empire and Italy.

Frivaldszky wrote extensively on plants, snakes, snails and especially insects (Lepidoptera and Coleoptera). A large part of his huge entomological collection was destroyed in a flood in 1838, the rest in 1956 during the anticommunist revolution. Many of his specimens are in the Natural History Museum of the University of Pisa. His nephew János Frivaldszky also became an entomologist and curator at the Hungarian National Museum.

Notes
 This article includes material from the Slovak and Hungarian Wikipedia.

References

External links
 Frivaldszky family website
 Obituary in the Österreichische botanische Zeitschrift, 1870
 Bálint Zs. and S Abadjev: An annotated list of Imre Frivaldszky’s publications. Annales Historico-Naturales Musei Naturalis Hungarici 98:185,2006.

1799 births
1870 deaths
People from Trebišov District
Botanists with author abbreviations
19th-century Hungarian botanists
Hungarian entomologists
Hungarian lepidopterists
Pteridologists
Members of the Hungarian Academy of Sciences